Tywyn & Bryncrug Football Club is a Welsh football club based in Bryncrug, Gwynedd. They currently play in the Central Wales League Northern Division.

The home colours are orange shirts with black shorts and orange socks.

History
The club were formed in 1989 as merger of Bryncrug FC and Tywyn FC and played in the Mid Wales League for two seasons before leaving the league. They rejoined the league for the 2006–07 season. They were league champions of the West Division for the 2021–22 season.

Honours

Mid Wales Football League West Division – Champions: 2021–22
Aberystwyth League Division One – Runners-up: 1994–95, 1995–96
Aberystwyth League Division Two – Champions: 1991–92, 1994-95 (reserves)
J. Emrys Morgan Cup – Runners-up: 2021–22

External links
Club Facebook
Club Twitter

References 

Football clubs in Wales
Mid Wales Football League clubs
Sport in Gwynedd
1886 establishments in Wales
Association football clubs established in 1886